THC hemisuccinate (Δ9-THC-O-hemisuccinate, Dronabinol hemisuccinate) is a synthetic derivative of tetrahydrocannabinol, developed in the 1990s. It is a water-soluble prodrug ester which is converted into THC inside the body, and was developed to overcome the poor bioavailability of THC when taken by non-inhaled routes of administration.

See also 
 THC-O-acetate
 THC-O-phosphate
 SP-111

References 

Benzochromenes
Cannabinoids